This is a list of episodes for the Malaysian educational comedy television series, Oh My English!

Series overview

Episodes

Season 1 (2012)

Season 2 (2013)

Season 3 (2014)

Season 4 - Class of 2015 (2015)

Season 5 - After School (2016)

 Jibam is absent three and a half episodes.

Season 6 - Level Up! (2017)

Telemovie

References

http://www.astro.com.my/ohmyenglish

Lists of Malaysian television series episodes